Makati, officially the City of Makati, is a 1st class highly urbanized city in the National Capital Region of the Philippines.

Makati is the financial center of the Philippines; it has the highest concentration of multinational and local corporations in the country. Major banks, corporations, department stores as well as foreign embassies are based in Makati. The biggest trading floor of the Philippine Stock Exchange used to be situated along the city's Ayala Avenue, before the stock exchange moved their headquarters to the Bonifacio Global City in Taguig. Makati is also known for being a major cultural and entertainment hub in Metro Manila.

According to the 2020 census, it has a population of 629,616 people making it as the 17th most populous city in the country and ranked as the 41st most densely populated city in the world with 19,336 inhabitants per square kilometer. Although its population is just above half a million, the daytime population of the city is estimated to be more than one million during a typical working day because of the large number of people who go to the city to work, shop, and do business.

History

Parts of the city were once subject to the pre-Hispanic Kingdom of Namayan, whose capital is now in the Santa Ana district of Manila. While under the jurisdiction of the Franciscan friars during the 17th century, it was established as a town in 1670 under the name San Pedro Macati out of the southern barangays of the then-town of Santa Ana.

In 1851, Don José Bonifacio Róxas (an ancestor of the Zóbel de Ayala family) purchased the Jesuit estate of "Hacienda San Pedro de Macati" for 52,800 pesos. Since then, the development of Makati has remained linked with the Zóbel de Ayala family and their company, Ayala Corporation. In 1890, San Pedro de Macati was proclaimed as a public town of Manila. In 1901, it was incorporated into the newly-established province of Rizal. On February 28, 1914, the name of the town was shortened to its present name of Makati, by virtue of Philippine Legislature Act No. 2390.

On January 1, 1942, Makati was one of the municipalities of Rizal merged alongside Manila and Quezon City to form the City of Greater Manila as an emergency measure by President Manuel L. Quezon. It regained its pre-war status as a municipality of Rizal when the City of Greater Manila was dissolved by President Sergio Osmeña effective August 1, 1945.

Post-war
After the destruction Second World War had brought upon Manila, and the subsequent closure of Nielson Field, the town grew rapidly, and real estate values boomed. The first of the planned communities (in what are now the barangays Forbes Park, Urdaneta, San Lorenzo and Bel-Air) were established in the 1950s with the efforts of its landowner, Ayala y Compañía. At the same time, Fort McKinley, then renamed Fort Bonifacio, and the then Philippine Army headquarters, became the starting point for the building up of seven more communities by military families who worked in the base area. The first office buildings were built on what is now the Makati Central Business District (CBD). Since the late 1960s, Makati has transformed into the financial and commercial capital of the country.

On November 7, 1975, Makati was separated from Rizal province to become part of the National Capital Region as a component municipality.

1970s–1980s

Makati was the setting of what is believed to be the single biggest case of involuntary disappearance during martial law – the case of the "Southern Tagalog 10" – ten activists from the nearby Southern Tagalog region, mostly in their twenties, who were abducted in late July 1977 at the Makati Medical Center.

Following the assassination of opposition senator Benigno Aquino Jr. on August 21, 1983, Makati became a nexus for protests against the dictatorship of President Ferdinand Marcos. Known as the Confetti Revolution, the demonstrations held in the central business district were led partly by employees of major corporations based in the area, culminating in the 1986 People Power Revolution that toppled Marcos’ 20-year authoritarian regime. His political rival and successor, Corazon Aquino–the wife of the deceased senator Aquino–became the eleventh and first female president of the Philippines.

In January 1986, Fort Bonifacio and the Embo barangays of Cembo, South Cembo, West Rembo, East Rembo, Comembo, Pembo and Pitogo were transferred to the control of Makati.

After Mayor Nemesio Yabut had become ill in February 1986 and eventually died on February 25, coinciding with the last day of the People Power Revolution. Aquino appointed Jejomar Binay as acting mayor of the town of Makati two days later; he was subsequently elected as mayor in 1988.

Cityhood

On January 2, 1995, President Fidel V. Ramos signed Republic Act No. 7854, making Makati the seventh city in Metro Manila. The law was approved by a plebiscite one month later, on February 2, 1995, by majority of voters.

Contemporary history

On May 17, 2000, at 5:02 p.m., the Glorietta Mall located inside the Ayala Center was bombed, injuring 13 persons. According to local authorities, the homemade bomb originated from the restroom of a restaurant and affected an adjacent video arcade. The bombing was said to be the precursor of the May 21, 2000 SM Megamall bombing and the Rizal Day bombings. On October 19, 2007, an explosion in Glorietta 2 left eleven people dead and injured more than a hundred. Initially, authorities said that it was caused by a liquefied petroleum gas explosion at a restaurant, but later began investigating the possibility that the explosion may have been a C-4 bomb.

Geography
Makati is located within the circle of 14′40″ °north and 121′3″ °E right at the center of Metro Manila. The city is bounded on the north by the Pasig River, facing Mandaluyong, on the northeast by Pasig, on the southeast by Pateros and Taguig, on the northwest by the city of Manila, and on the southwest by Pasay.

Barangays

Makati is divided into 33 barangays (the smallest local government units) which handles governance in a much smaller area. These barangays are grouped into two congressional districts where each district is represented by a congressman in the country's House of Representatives. The 1st Congressional District is composed of the barangays straddling EDSA, the barangays to the north and west of them, while excluding Guadalupe Viejo, while the 2nd Congressional District is to the south and east of the 1st District, including the aforementioned barangay. The districts elect the sixteen members of the city council, eight from each of the two congressional districts, that are coextensive with the congressional districts.

Notes

Climate
Under the Köppen climate classification system, the city features a tropical monsoon climate. Together with the rest of the Philippines, Makati lies entirely within the tropics. However, humidity levels are usually very high which makes it feel much warmer. It has a distinct, albeit relatively short dry season from January through May, and a relatively lengthy wet season from June through December.

Climate change 
The Global Climate Risk Index 2021 lists the Philippines as one of countries most affected by catastrophes due to extreme weather events. Makati is a low-lying, coastal city vulnerable to natural calamities intensified by climate change, such as typhoons, floods, and landslides. The city's disaster risk reduction and management office noted a rise in rainfall experienced by the city over the years, particularly during the rainy season.

In August 2022, the city government declared a climate emergency, amid rising sea levels and global temperature changes.

Makati undertakes climate adaptation programs to address vulnerabilities to climate change, which include health services to residents, emergency response, and environmental management and protection. It intends to increase projects to address climate change, including a planned purchase of more electric vehicles, installation of solar panels in public schools and government offices, and improvement of public transport to lessen greenhouse gas emissions.

Cityscape

Demographics

Makati has a population of 629,616 as of the 2020 census. Makati ranks ninth in population size within Metro Manila municipalities. 88.9% of Makati residents identified their religious affiliation as Roman Catholic. Other groups having large number of members in the city are the Church of Jesus Christ of Latter-day Saints, Ang Dating Daan, Iglesia ni Cristo, Protestantism, Islam, Hinduism, Buddhism and Judaism.

Based on the city's Transport and Traffic Improvement Plan 2004–2014, the city's daytime population is estimated to be 3.7 million during weekdays, owing to the large number of people who come to work, do business, or shop.

The daily influx of people into the city provides the skilled labor force that allows Makati to handle the service requirements of domestic as well as international transactions; it also serves as the base of a large consumer market that fuels the retail and service trade in the city. At the same time, however, the large tidal population flows exert pressure on Makati's environment, services, and utilities, most noticeably causing large traffic volumes along the major road corridors leading to the city as well as within and at the periphery of the central business district.

Economy and infrastructure

The city of Makati remains the richest local government unit (LGU) in the Philippines in terms of income from local sources and on a per capita basis. As of end-2012, Makati had registered over 62,000 business enterprises, which are engaged in financial services, wholesale/retail, services, real estate, export/import, and manufacturing. Makati also boasts of having the highest number of BPO offices in Metro Manila at 1,159 companies to date, as well as the highest number of PEZA-accredited IT Parks and Buildings. The city government of Makati has not increased its tax rates since its new Revenue Code took effect in 2006. The city has been free of deficit for 26 years.

The Ayala Triangle is a sub-district of the Makati CBD, comprising the parcel of land between Ayala Avenue, Makati Avenue and Paseo de Roxas, as well as the buildings on those streets. Many multinational companies, banks, and other major businesses are located within the triangle. A few upscale boutiques, restaurants, and a park called Ayala Triangle Gardens are also located in the area. Ayala Avenue and Paseo de Roxas also have the distinction of being the runways of the former Nielson Field, Metro Manila's main airport in the 1930s.

The Makati Business Club has over 800 chief executive officers and senior executives, which represents 450 of the country's biggest corporations.

Most of the tallest skyscrapers in Metro Manila and the Philippines are located in Makati such as the PBCom Tower, Gramercy Residences in Century City and G.T. International Tower.

PBCom Tower along Ayala Avenue was the country's tallest office building from 2001 to 2017. It is the headquarters of the Philippine Bank of Communications or PBCom.

Shopping centers

Makati is one of the most well-known shopping hubs of Metro Manila. Various shopping centers, offering both international and local retail shops, high-end boutiques, dining outlets and entertainment facilities can be found around the city.

The Ayala Center is a major commercial development operated by Ayala Land located in the Makati CBD. The center is known for its wide array of shopping, entertainment, and cultural offerings, making it a premier shopping and cultural district in the metropolis. It is a vast walkable complex with high-end malls that houses cinemas, local and international shops, homegrown restaurants and international food chains. The shopping malls that are located at the Ayala Center include Greenbelt, Glorietta, Park Square, The Link, and One Ayala. The Ayala Center is also home to three department stores, namely: SM Makati, Rustan's, and The Landmark.

Other shopping centers in Makati include Power Plant Mall at Rockwell Center, Century City Mall at Century City, Ayala Malls Circuit, Cash & Carry Mall, Makati Cinema Square, Guadalupe Commercial Center, Paseo de Magallanes, and pocket malls at various high-rise residential condominiums or office buildings in the city.

Education

The University of Makati, a public, non-profit university, is the city's flagship university. Other institutions of higher education located in the city include the Asian Institute of Management (AIM), iAcademy, Asian Seminary of Christian Ministries (ASCM), Don Bosco Technical Institute of Makati, Assumption College San Lorenzo, Saint Paul College of Makati, Our Lady of Guadalupe Minor Seminary, and Asia Pacific College.

Several higher education institutions headquartered outside the city have established branch or satellite campuses in Makati. These include the Ateneo de Manila University (Ateneo Professional Schools), De La Salle University, Far Eastern University, Mapúa Institute of Technology, Lyceum of the Philippines University, Centro Escolar University, and AMA Computer College Colleges, among others.

Australian Catholic University, a foreign institution, maintains an extension program in Makati.

Culture and sports

Makati is home to a number of fine art museums, colonial-era churches and recreation areas. Along the south-eastern border of Makati beyond Forbes Park are the Manila Golf Club and the Manila Polo Club. The Manila Golf Club features an 18-hole golf course. The Manila Polo Club counts among its polo enthusiasts some of the country's wealthiest people. The Makati Sports Club in Salcedo Village is another popular place for sports. The Makati Coliseum is another famous sports landmark in the city, where some of the biggest sports gatherings are held.

The University of Makati Stadium was the home venue of Philippines Football League club Kaya F.C.–Iloilo, prior to their move to Iloilo City. In the northwest, Circuit Makati Blue Pitch is a multi-use stadium, used not just for football games but since 2017 serves as the primary hub of the Philippine-American Football League.

The Ayala Museum is a private fine arts and history museum housing various exhibitions such as the "Gold of Ancestors," an exhibition of more than one thousand golden pre-Hispanic artifacts. Other popular museums also in Makati also include the Yuchengco Museum and the Museo ng Makati.

Makati has several Spanish-era churches, such as the Our Lady of Guadalupe and the Nuestra Señora de Gracia Church (Our Lady of Grace) in the old town. At the Greenbelt Park stands the modern domed Sto. Niño de Paz Greenbelt Chapel. Between Forbes Park and Dasmariñas Village is the Santuario de San Antonio, a popular church for weddings in the Makati area. The National Shrine of the Sacred Heart is located in San Antonio Village. Makati also houses the country's only Jewish synagogue, Beth Yaacov.

There is a red-light district around Padre Burgos Street in Barangay Poblacion.

Future development
Ayala Land and the Makati Tourism Foundation launched a year-long campaign titled "Make It Happen, Make it Makati" to increase Makati's visibility as an arts and culture destination. The campaign is part of Ayala's ongoing US$1.5 billion redevelopment masterplan for Makati, which began in 2011 and divides the city into six distinct hubs for business, lifestyle, entertainment and transport.

Transportation

Major roads in Metro Manila surround Makati, such as Epifanio de los Santos Avenue (EDSA), located in the southwestern part of the city, the South Luzon Expressway (SLEX), which intersect EDSA at the Magallanes Interchange, the Skyway which is built on top of SLEX and Osmeña Highway, and Carlos P. Garcia Avenue (C-5) which traverses the eastern portion of Makati.

Land
Two of Metro Manila's main arteries pass through Makati. The Epifanio de los Santos Avenue (EDSA) pass along the city's southeast part and connects it with the cities of Mandaluyong and Pasay. The South Luzon Expressway (SLEX) starts in southwestern Makati and connects it with southern Metro Manila and Southern Luzon. The Skyway is an elevated expressway that connects with NLEX and SLEX, providing residents coming from Northern Luzon, Northern Metro Manila, Southern Luzon and other cities of Southern Metro Manila a fast way to reach Makati. SLEX and EDSA intersect at the Magallanes Interchange, which is the most complex system of elevated roadways in Metro Manila. Carlos P. Garcia Avenue, a component of Circumferential Road 5 that runs parallel to EDSA, traverses the eastern portion of Makati and connects it with Taguig and Pasig.

Buses plying the Epifanio de los Santos Avenue (EDSA/C-4) route from Parañaque to Quezon City and Caloocan pass through the central business/financial district daily, as well as buses to and from Alabang in Muntinlupa, Biñan and Santa Rosa in Laguna, and Carmona in Cavite. Premium Point-to-Point Bus Service buses also ply the city especially the Central Business District towards other parts of Metro Manila and Southern Luzon. The BGC Bus also connects the city and Bonifacio Global City, with a terminal at the McKinley Exchange Corporate Center. Jeepneys ply Makati's inner roads and connect the city to its surrounding towns and cities.

The country's first-ever e-jeepney and hybrid bus services were piloted in Makati. The buses are parallel electric hybrids, powered by an electric motor and a Euro 3 diesel motor. The hybrid buses ply the route from Gil Puyat Avenue (Tramo/LRT-1 Taft) to Kalayaan Avenue (near C-5), which are considered among the busiest in the city's central business district, cutting through other major roads like South Superhighway; Chino Roces, Ayala and Makati Avenues; Paseo de Roxas and EDSA.

Other major roads in the city include Gil Puyat Avenue, which connects EDSA and SLEX in the north; Ayala Avenue, an important street that runs through the Makati CBD; McKinley Road, which connects the city to Bonifacio Global City; Arnaiz Avenue, which connects the city to Pasay; Osmeña Highway, which connects SLEX to the city of Manila; Makati Avenue, which connects Ayala Avenue with Gil Puyat Avenue, also extending north to the Makati–Mandaluyong Bridge; and J. P. Rizal Avenue, the oldest main thoroughfare of Makati which connects it to the city of Manila and Pateros. At the center of Makati is the Ayala Triangle, a park built on the former Nielsen Air Base.

Railways

Manila Metro Rail Transit System Line 3 (MRT Line 3) on EDSA has four stations located in Makati: Guadalupe, Buendia, Ayala and Magallanes.

The Philippine National Railways has three stations in the city: Dela Rosa, Pasay Road and EDSA. Pasay Road, formerly known as Culi-culi and Pio del Pilar, is the first railway station in Makati. Dela Rosa replaced the old Buendia station in 2017.

In 2013, the National Economic and Development Authority (NEDA) worked on a feasibility study for a $1.75 billion monorail project. The proposed  elevated monorail is envisioned to connect Makati, Bonifacio Global City and Pasay through MRT Line 3 as well as Ninoy Aquino International Airport. The present alignment being considered starts from the Guadalupe MRT Station, enters Bonifacio Global City through the north gate and ends at Ninoy Aquino International Airport Terminal 3. If approved, the monorail project can be completed by 2016.

In 2015, NEDA approved the Public-Private Partnership project for the Makati-Pasay-Taguig Mass Transit System Loop which will have stations at key points in Makati namely Buendia MRT station, Ayala-EDSA, Ayala Triangle, Makati Post Office and PNR-Buendia which was later shelved and partially revived in 2018 as the Makati Intra-City Subway which inherits most of the stations in Makati and its designation as Line 5.

Airport
The city is 20 minutes away from Ninoy Aquino International Airport.

Water
The Pasig River is located north of Makati. The Pasig River Ferry Service has two stations in Makati: Guadalupe and Valenzuela.

Government

Local government

The incumbent mayor is Abby Binay, the daughter of former mayor and former Vice President Jejomar Binay. Monique Lagdameo is the incumbent vice mayor. The vice mayor heads a legislative council consisting of 18 members: 8 councilors from the 1st district, 8 councilors from the 2nd district, the President of the Sangguniang Kabataan (Youth Council) Federation representing the youth sector, and the President of the Association of Barangay Chairmen (ABC) as barangay sectoral representative. The council is in charge of creating the city's policies in the form of Ordinances and Resolutions. Current district representatives of the city are Romulo "Kid" Peña Jr., representing the 1st district and Luis Jose Angel Campos Jr., husband of Abby Binay, for the 2nd district.

Mayors

Seal of Makati

The Seal of Makati, adopted in August 1995, composes of the outline map of Makati containing 33 rays, green buildings, and a church.

The map of Makati is in golden yellow color which represents wealth and prosperity. The rays represent the 33 barangays of Makati which are described to be "surging forward to a brighter future". The color of the buildings symbolizes life which is described to reflect a "new progressive" Makati. The church represents the oldest church of Makati, the Nuestra Señora de Gracia, which was used by Filipino revolutionaries against the Spaniards in 1896 and the Americans in 1898. The waves represent the tide which came from the phrase "Makati na, Kumakati na" which means ebbing tide.

International relations

Diplomatic missions

Most of the diplomatic missions to Manila by foreign countries in the Philippines have their chanceries located in Makati:

|valign=top|

 (Taipei Economic and Cultural Office)
 (Consulate)

Sister cities
Makati's sister city is Los Angeles, California. Makati is also twinned with Ramapo, New York and Vladivostok, Russia.

See also

List of renamed cities and municipalities in the Philippines
Tourism in Manila

References

60. http://urbansdgplatform.org/profile/profile_caseView_detail.msc?no_case=281#:~:text=The%20establishment%20of%20a%20unified,launching%20of%20the%20Makatizen%20Card.

External links

 
 Makati Website
 https://www.makati.gov.ph/makatizen
 [ Philippine Standard Geographic Code]
 West Valley Fault in Pasig and Makati – 3230 III 17B Pasig
 West Valley Fault in Makati and Taguig – 3230 III 22a Taguig
 

 
1670 establishments in the Philippines
Cities in Metro Manila
Highly urbanized cities in the Philippines
Populated places established in 1670
Populated places on the Pasig River